The Servite Church is a church in Vienna, Austria.

History 
On September 16, 1638, Emperor Ferdinand III allowed the Servite Order to found a monastery in Vienna.

Inspired by Italian architect Andrea Palladio, the church of the Servites was built by Martin Carlone and dedicated to the Annunciation to the Virgin. The foundation stone was laid on November 11, 1651, and the church was consecrated in 1670 though the interior decoration was completed later.

The most important work of art in the church is the "Pietà" at the altar of Our Lady of Sorrows. The tomb of general Ottavio Piccolomini, who was an active patron of the church, is located under this altar. Another patron of the church was Baron Christoph Ignaz Abele who donated the "Liborius altar".

References

External links 
 Maria Verkündung Servitenkirche & Servitenplatz 
 Wiener Servitenkirche “Maria Verkündigung” 
 Servitenkirche Maria Verkündigung 

Roman Catholic churches completed in 1670
Roman Catholic church buildings in the Vicariate of Vienna City
Baroque architecture in Vienna
17th-century Roman Catholic church buildings in Austria
1670 establishments in Austria